The 2016 Ken Galluccio Cup was the eighth edition of the Ken Galluccio Cup, the European men's lacrosse club competition.

Stockport won its fourth title, the third consecutive one.

Competition format
The twelve teams were divided into four groups of three, where the two first qualified teams joined the quarterfinals.

Group stage

Group A

Group B

Group C

Group D

Championship bracket

Fifth-position bracket

Ninth-position group

References

External links
Official website
Competition at Pointbench.com

Ken Galluccio Cup
2016 in lacrosse
Ken Galluccio Cup